is a Japanese word meaning "friend(s)". Tamodachi is a possible misspelling. It can also refer to:

Songs 
"Tomodachi", a song by Ketsumeishi
"Tomodachi", a song by Milk & Bone
"Tomodachi no Wao!", a  song by Puffy AmiYumi
"Tomodachi", a song by Kyu Sakamoto, appearing on the compilation album Kyu Sakamoto Memorial Best
"Tomodachi", a song by Maaya Sakamoto released with the song "Yakusoku wa Iranai"
"Tomodachi e Say What You Will", a song by SMAP
"Tomodachi (song)", a song by Utada Hikaru, appearing on the album Fantôme

Manga and other literature 
Tomodachi, the fictional leader of a fictional apocalyptic sect in the manga 20th Century Boys by Naoki Urasawa
Tomodachi, an award-winning play by Kōbō Abe
Tomodachi, a chapter in volume one of the One Piece manga by Eiichiro Oda
Tomodachi – Edge of the World, a novel by author Simon Higgins
Tomodachi Game, a manga series conceptualized by Mikoto Yamaguchi and written and illustrated by Yuki Sato.

Other 
Tomodachi (film), a film featuring Yūsaku Matsuda
Tomodachi Collection, a game released in Japan on Nintendo DS
Tomodachi Life, a game released on Nintendo 3DS
Operation Tomodachi, an operation to assist to support Japan after the 2011 Tōhoku earthquake and tsunami
Tomo-Dachi, an anime convention in Northern Ireland

See also 

 Tamagotchi, egg pet